Milad Nouri  (May 3, 1986) is an Iranian football player, who currently plays for Siah Jamegan in the Persian Gulf Pro League. He usually plays as a midfielder.

Club career
Nouri played for Foolad in the 2006 AFC Champions League group stage. He joined Saba Qom in 2011 and was the leading Iran Pro League scorer in week 2 with four goals. By Week 10, Nouri was second with six goals. He finished the year with six goals, with Jalal Rafkhaei snatching eighteen and winning the golden boot. He joined  Rah Ahan in the summer of 2013 with a three-year contract.

Club career statistics
Last Update  18 February 2015 

 Assist Goals

Honours
Esteghlal
Iran Pro League (1): 2008–09

References

Iranian footballers
Association football midfielders
Foolad FC players
Steel Azin F.C. players
Esteghlal F.C. players
F.C. Aboomoslem players
Esteghlal Ahvaz players
Saba players
Rah Ahan players
1986 births
Living people
Asian Games bronze medalists for Iran
Iran international footballers
Asian Games medalists in football
Footballers at the 2006 Asian Games
Medalists at the 2006 Asian Games
People from Dezful
Sportspeople from Khuzestan province